Ahmad Khan Mahmoodzada (born 23 December 1997) is an Afghan former child actor. 

He played the role of Hassan, the loyal friend and servant of the richer boy Amir, in the film The Kite Runner (2007). In one scene, Hassan is attacked and it is suggested that he is raped. The filmmakers wanted Ahmad to take off his pants for the shooting, but his father refused to let him do that. Mahmoodzada said that he would never have taken the role had he known Hassan would be raped. Reports vary on whether he and his family were properly informed in advance. The scene has now been depicted in a less harrowing manner than originally planned, and there is no nudity in it. Nevertheless, a body double was used to show the boy's pants being tugged slightly down.

Because of cultural misunderstandings, there has been concern about the safety of him and the other two main boy actors. Therefore, Paramount Pictures relocated them and their relatives to the United Arab Emirates.

After three years in the UAE, Mahmoodzada and his family had to move back to Afghanistan. People there were very negative towards him starring in the film and he received death threats. In 2011, he fled to Sweden and is now living in Borlänge where he is studying Swedish and intends to return to acting. He hosted a 90-minute episode of a long running summer radio show on Sweden's Public Radio on 1 July 2016, in which he tells his story.

Sources

 
 
The Evening Standard (London), December 27, 2007. Accessed 8 January 2008.

References

External links

Living people
Afghan male child actors
Hazara artists
Afghan expatriates in the United Arab Emirates
People from Kabul
21st-century Afghan male actors
1997 births